The Gomphotherium land bridge was a land bridge that connected Eurasia to Afro-Arabia between approximately 19 Mya (million years ago) and 15 Mya.

Significance
Passage of fauna between Eurasia and the Arabian Plate and thus Africa was largely hindered before the Early Miocene, as animals could not cross the open Tethyan seaway. However, during the mid-Burdigalian, the tectonic plates of Afro-Arabia and Eurasia collided, creating a terrestrial isthmus connecting the two landmasses.
This faunal exchange that resulted is known as the Proboscidean Datum Event.
The land bridge allowed the elephantine Gomphotheres and other proboscideans to migrate out of Africa and into Eurasia. It is believed that the connection between the Mediterranean and Indian oceans was temporarily re-established during the Langhian stage of the Middle Miocene, before reclosing, and has remained closed to present day.

References 

Historical geography
Miocene